Der Bastian is a West German television series written by Barbara Noack, broadcast in 13 episodes in 1973 on ZDF.

See also
List of German television series

External links
 

1973 German television series debuts
1973 German television series endings
Television shows set in Munich
German-language television shows
ZDF original programming